In mathematics, a Borwein integral is an integral whose unusual properties were first presented by mathematicians David Borwein and Jonathan Borwein in 2001.

These integrals are remarkable for exhibiting apparent patterns that eventually break down. The following is an example.  

This pattern continues up to 

At the next step the obvious pattern fails,

 

In general, similar integrals have value  whenever the numbers  are replaced by positive real numbers such that the sum of their reciprocals is less than 1.

In the example above,  but 

With the inclusion of the additional factor , the pattern holds up over a longer series,

but

In this case,  but . The exact answer can be calculated using the general formula provided in the next section, and a representation of it is shown below. Fully expanded, this value turns into a fraction that involves two 2736 digit integers.

The reason the original and the extended series break down has been demonstrated with an intuitive mathematical explanation. In particular, a random walk reformulation with a causality argument sheds light on the pattern breaking and opens the way for a number of generalizations.

General formula 
Given a sequence of nonzero real numbers, a general formula for the integral

 

can be given. With this notation, the value for the above integral is

 

where

 

In the case when , we have .

 

The first example is the case when .

Note that if  then  and  but , so because , we get that

 

which remains true if we remove any of the products, but that

 

which is equal to the value given previously.

Infinite products 

While the integral 

  

becomes less than  when  exceeds 6, it never becomes much less, and in fact Borwein and Bailey have shown

 

where we can pull the limit out of the integral thanks to the dominated convergence theorem.  Similarly, while

  

becomes less than  when  exceeds 55, we have

 

Furthermore, using the Weierstrass factorizations

one can show

and with a change of variables obtain

and

Probabilistic formulation 

Schmuland  has given appealing probabilistic formulations of the infinite product Borwein integrals.  For example, consider the random harmonic series

where one flips independent fair coins to choose the signs.  This series converges almost surely, that is, with probability 1.  The probability density function of the result is a well-defined function, and value of this function at 2 is close to 1/8.  However, it is closer to

Schmuland's explanation is that this quantity is  times

References

External links 

 

Integrals